Heisteria cyathiformis is a species of plant in the family Olacaceae. It is endemic to Ecuador.

References

Flora of Ecuador
Olacaceae
Endangered plants
Taxonomy articles created by Polbot